

Cieszków  is a village (former town) in Milicz County, Lower Silesian Voivodeship, in south-western Poland. It is the seat of the administrative district (gmina) called Gmina Cieszków.

The village has a population of 1,800.

References

Villages in Milicz County
Former populated places in Lower Silesian Voivodeship